Richard Russell (born 24 November 1967) is an English former professional rugby league footballer who played in the 1980s and 1990s.

Playing career

International honours
Richard Russell won a cap for England while at Castleford Tigers in 1995 against Wales.

World Club Challenge
Richard Russell played  in Wigan's 8–2 victory over Manly-Warringah Sea Eagles in the 1987 World Club Challenge at Central Park, Wigan on Wednesday 7 October 1987.

County Cup Final appearances
Richard Russell played  in Wigan's 28–16 victory Warrington in the 1987 Lancashire Cup Final during the 1987–88 season at Knowsley Road, St. Helens, on Sunday 11 October 1987. and played as an interchange/substitute, (replacing  Duncan Platt) in Oldham's 16–24 defeat by Warrington in the 1989 Lancashire Cup Final during the 1989–90 season at Knowsley Road, St. Helens on Saturday 14 October 1989.

Regal Trophy Final appearances
Richard Russell played  in Castleford Tigers' 33–2 victory over Wigan in the 1993–94 Regal Trophy Final during the 1993–94 season at Headingley, Leeds on Saturday 22 January 1994.

He began his career at Saddleworth Rangers

References

External links
(archived by web.archive.org) Profile at thecastlefordtigers.co.uk
Statistics at wigan.rlfans.com
Statistics at orl-heritagetrust.org.uk
Russell is hooked by hooking
Tony Smith and Richard Russell, both England internationals, have signed new contracts with Castleford

1967 births
Living people
Castleford Tigers players
England national rugby league team players
English rugby league players
Great Britain under-21 national rugby league team players
Oldham R.L.F.C. players
Rugby league hookers
Rugby league players from Oldham
Rugby league wingers
Wigan Warriors players